Saarjõgi Landscape Conservation Area is a nature park in Viljandi County, Estonia.

The area of the nature park is 1759 ha.

The protected area was founded in 2006 to protect landscapes and biodiversity in Rassi (Türi Parish), Kaansoo (Vändra Parish) and Kootsi village (Suure-Jaani Parish).

References

Nature reserves in Estonia
Geography of Viljandi County